The Florenceville Bridge is a wooden covered bridge combined with a steel trusses which crosses the Saint John River at Florenceville, New Brunswick, Canada. Built in 1907, the 46.9 metre (154 foot) bridge has one wooden Howe truss span, four steel through trusses and one plate girder span.  The bridge evolved from a five span uncovered Burr Truss bridge built in 1885. One Burr span was converted to a covered Howe truss and in 1907 the others were converted to steel thru trusses.

See also 
 List of bridges in Canada

References

Road bridges in New Brunswick
Transport in Carleton County, New Brunswick
Buildings and structures in Carleton County, New Brunswick
Bridges over the Saint John River (Bay of Fundy)
Bridges completed in 1907
Covered bridges in Canada
Wooden bridges in Canada
Truss bridges
Howe truss bridges
Plate girder bridges
Steel bridges